Gangavaram is a suburban area in Visakhapatnam.

Geography
This village comes under the Greater Visakhapatnam Corporation in Andhra Pradesh, India.

Beach
The beach in  Gangavaram is called Gangavaram Beach. It was named after the town which existed before the Visakhapatnam Steel Plant was constructed.

Transport
APSRTC routes

Festivals
All of the Hindu festivals are celebrated in the village. The Maaghapournami is celebrated in February through March, the people from surrounding villages bathe in the sea. There is even a small fair on this day. The Paidithalamma Ammavaari Panduga festival is celebrated every other year in mid-June.

Village demolished
Gangavaaram village still exists but Dibbapalem Village was removed from the area and all the families are shifted to two places. Most of the people working at Visakhapatnam Steel plant are shifter near Srinagar and the people who have their living from fishing are located near Peda Gantyada. During this, there was a lot of tension which went on for several months leading to strikes and police firing. While 1,270 families accepted the compensation package and agreed to vacate their houses, 350 owing allegiance to the Vedika refused to leave the village, demanding categorical assurance from the management of the private port to provide permanent jobs to at least one member of the project-affected family.

Gangavaram Port
The whole village is vacated and construction of the port began in December 2005, and commercial operations commenced in August 2008. The port was formally inaugurated in July 2009, by the Andhra Pradesh Chief Minister Y S Rajasekhara Reddy. The port is called Gangavaram Port after the name of the beach. This is the deepest port in India.
Fishermen in the Gangavaram and Dibbapalem villages, who were directly affected by the construction of the port, demanded construction of an alternative jetty and a relief and rehabilitation package.

References

Neighbourhoods in Visakhapatnam